Archips issiki is a species of moth of the family Tortricidae. It is found in China (Heilongjiang, Liaoning, Shandong, Shaanxi, Xinjiang), South Korea, Japan and Russia
(Ussuri, Primorye).

The larvae feed on Abies concolor, Abies firma, Abies sachalinensis and Larix kaempferi.

References

Moths described in 1960
Archips
Moths of Asia